PP-269 Kot Addu-I is a Constituency of Provincial Assembly of Punjab.

General elections 2013

General elections 2008

See also
 PP-268 Kot Addu-cum-Muzaffargarh
 PP-270 Kot Addu-II

References

External links
 Election commission Pakistan's official website
 Awazoday.com check result
 Official Website of Government of Punjab

Provincial constituencies of Punjab, Pakistan

Constituencies of Muzaffargarh
Politics of Muzaffargarh
Constituencies of Punjab, Pakistan
Constituencies of Pakistan